Troels Kløvedal (born Troels Beha Erichsen, 2 April 1943 – 23 December 2018) was a Danish author, long-distance sailor and lecturer based in Ebeltoft, Denmark. He and his family are known for their circumnavigation of earth in the steel galleass Nordkaperen, which he and two friends bought in 1967.

Biography 
Kløvedal was son of veterinary physician Asbjørn Beha Erichsen (1903–1971) and preschool director Gurli Marie Larsen (1908–1954). Kløvedal was the father of TV host Mikkel Beha Erichsen and film producer and journalist Lærke Kløvedal, and brother of social worker Hanne Reintoft, executive director Lise Beha Erichsen, TV producer Bjørn Erichsen, and sculptor Minea Beha.

In the late 1960s, Kløvedal joined the Svanemølle-collective, which in 1970 was renamed to Maos Lyst. Here he changed his name from Beha Erichsen to Kløvedal, like all other members of the collective, named after the elvish city in Tolkien's The Lord of the Rings.

In 1974 he started his first circumnavigation of earth with Nordkaperen. He circumnavigated the earth three times, and also sailed in waters such as the Aegean Sea, Atlantic Ocean, Pacific Ocean, Polynesia, China Seas and among Indonesian isles.

In the 1970s Kløvedal started to publish his travel experiences in Denmark with photos and text, later followed by travel reports and travel books. In 1977 he married nurse Maiken Junker Kløvedal, with whom he had a daughter, Lærke Kløvedal. In 1980 they divorced. After that he met Ruth Hagerup Andersen, whom he lived with for 15 years. Together they had two daughters, Gurli Marie and Sille.

In 1978 Kløvedal published his first book, Kærligheden, kildevandet... og det blå ocean, He has since published 17 books, made many movies and held about 2000 talks.

In 2002 Kløvedal married Else Marie Meldgaard, with whom he had a son, Asbjørn.

In 2010 he was the narrator and organizer in seven TV programs on national broadcaster DR about the Danish Navy's history, where he, among others, interviewed Queen Margrethe II.

In 2013 the TV program Mit Danmark shown on TV 2 Fri, where Troels Kløvedal travels with Nordkaperen in Denmark and tells about the history, geography, nature, culture and religion of Denmark.

In 2015 Kløvedal sailed with the Nordkaperen to Greece and followed Odysseus's journey. This resulted in the TV 2 program Nordkaperen i Grækenland.

In October 2016 Kløvedal announced that he had been diagnosed with the lung disease bronchiectasis and the rare and aggressive disease ALS, who slowly paralyzes the body.

Kløvedal was made Knight of the Order of the Dannebrog in 2016.

In the book 'Alle mine morgener på jorden' fra 2017 Kløvedal told that he, with the help of lawyer Knud Foldschack, had ensured that Nordkaperen could continue to sail after his death. He wrote: "I have bequeathed the ship to my 5 children and 10 young navigators, who all have borrowed Nordkaperen in longer periods, and can board directly and sail in it."

On 1 November 2018 the Danish Natural History Museum in Aarhus opened an exhibition about Troels Kløvedal, which exhibits photos, videos, and cultural and natural historic objects, that he collected on his journeys. In October 2019 the exhibition reopens on M/S Museet for Søfart in Helsingør.

Troels Kløvedal died on 23 December 2018 due to the incurable lung disease bronchiectasia and ALS.

Bibliography 
 Kærligheden, kildevandet... og det blå ocean, 1978
 Fra Tahiti til Thyborøn med Nordkaperen, 1980
 Fra mit hjerte, min køjesæk og min græske logbog, 1982
 Med Nordøstpassaten over Atlanten (children's book), 1982
 Sydhavssejlads (children's book), 1982
 Mod indonesiske vulkaner, (children's book) 1983
 Bidevind og blåhvaler, 1984
 Med monsunen hjemover (children's book), 1984
 Grækenland igen, efterårssejlads gennem et slør af vinløvsranker – de ioniske øer i aftenlys (short story), 1984
 Højsommer, 1986
 At synge, at danse og at bede sammen (short story), 1987
 Hvad sang sirenerne, 1989
 Øerne under vinden, 1992
 Til søs med Gurli Marie : en eventyrlig rejse til Polynesien (children's book), 1992
 Den tynde hud : erindringer om en barndom og opvækst, 1994
 Afrodites smil : en rejse fra det Indiske Ocean til Ægæerhavet, 1996
 At være et frit menneske (essays), 1997
 Åbn din dør for din nabo (essays), 2002
 - og den halve verden, 2002
 Kineserne syr med lang tråd: på togt med Nordkaperen op ad Yangtze, 2004
 Med Asbjørn på de store oceaner, 2005
 Fortællinger fra den danske flådes historie gennem 500 år, 2010
 Alle mine morgener på jorden: Mit autodidakte liv, 2017

Movies 
 Troels Kløvedal og Nordkaperen i det Indiske Ocean - Op langs Malabarkysten
 
 Troels Kløvedal og Nordkaperen i det Indiske Ocean - På togt i det Røde Hav
 Troels Kløvedal og Nordkaperen i det Indiske Ocean - På togt i Andamanerhavet
 

Kløvedal appeared in the movie Cirkus Ildebrand i 1995.

References

External links 
 Troels Kløvedals officielle hjemmeside
 Troels Kløvedal på Bibliografi.dk
 www.tv2ostjylland.dk
 TV2, Troels Kløvedal dødeligt syg: - Jeg dør snart

Danish television presenters
Danish writers
Danish sailors
1943 births
2018 deaths
People from Ebeltoft
Things named after Tolkien works